Godswill Obioma (12 December 1953 – 31 May 2021), was a Nigerian professor and the registrar of National Examination Council, NECO, until his death on 31 May 2021.

Early life and education 
Godswill Obioma is a native of Amaokpu, Nkpa, Bende Local Government Area, Abia State. In 1975, he graduated from Alvan Ikoku Federal College of Education where he studied mathematics and physics, graduating with distinction and as the overall best graduating student. In 1979, he graduated from the University of Nigeria, Nsukka where he studied mathematics and education, graduating as the best graduating student. In 1982, he graduated with a master's degree in educational measurement and evaluation in the same university. In 1985, he furthered in the same university and graduated with doctorate degree in the same field and won the vice chancellor's award for the best doctoral dissertation.

Career 
In 1979, Obioma began his career at the University of Nigeria, Nsukka as a research fellow, after previously been retained by the same institution when he graduated. He left the university in 1988 and moved to the University of Jos and became the head of the research division of the institute of education as a senior research fellow.

In 1991 at the age of 38, he was appointed a professor of mathematics education and evaluation at University of Jos, brcoming the head of department, department of science, mathematics and technology education in 1993. He served as the special assistant on policy monitoring and evaluation to the military administrator of Abia State in 1994.

Obioma served as the director, monitoring and evaluation of the National Primary Education Commission, Kaduna from 1994 to 2000 before becoming the director, monitoring and evaluation, Universal Basic Education Programme, Abuja in 2000. He served as the director, monitoring, research and statistics, National Board for Technical Education (NABTEB), Benin City from 2003 to 2005, .

He served as a special assistant to the minister of education, before serving for two terms as the executive secretary, Nigerian Educational Research and Development Council, Sheda, Abuja from March 2005. He joined Independent National Electoral Commission, INEC, becoming the Resident Electoral Commissioner of Ebonyi State.

Registrar of NECO 
Obioma was appointed by the president of Nigeria, Muhammadu Buhari as the registrar of National Examination Council, NECO for a five years tenure to replace Abubakar Gana from 14 May 2020.

References 

Living people
1953 births
People from Abia State
University of Jos alumni